Attorney General Hunter may refer to:

Michael J. Hunter (born 1956), Attorney General of Oklahoma
Richard C. Hunter (1884–1941), Attorney General of Nebraska

See also
General Hunter (disambiguation)